Fuscoderma is a genus of lichenized fungi in the family Pannariaceae. It was originally circumscribed as a subgenus of the genus Leioderma by David Galloway and Per Magnus Jørgensen in 1987. The same authors promoted it to generic status a couple of years later in 1989. The New Guinean species F. papuanum was added to the genus in 2002.

References

Peltigerales
Peltigerales genera
Taxa described in 1987
Taxa named by Per Magnus Jørgensen
Taxa named by David Galloway (botanist)
Lichen genera